The joint Philippine–Japanese–Indonesian bid for the 2023 FIBA Basketball World Cup was the Samahang Basketbol ng Pilipinas, Japan Basketball Association, and the Indonesian Basketball Association's successful bid for the right to host the 2023 FIBA Basketball World Cup.

The campaign was led by the Philippines where most of the proposed venues are situated. The bid was one of the two finalist bids, along with the joint Argentina–Uruguay bid.

Background

Bid Development

Philippine-led initiatives
Following the failed bid to China, the Philippines as early as January 2016 expressed interest to make a joint bid for the 2023 FIBA World Cup with another country. The Philippines considered to make a joint bid with Malaysia, Singapore or South Korea.

Indonesia as co-bidding country
The bid was initially submitted as a joint bid by two countries; Philippines and Indonesia. It was submitted to FIBA on January 28, 2017 with the group stage proposed to be held in both countries and the Philippines solely host the final knockout phase.

Japan joins the co-bidding
The President of the Philippine Basketball Federation (SBP) Al Panlilio announced on February 6,  2017 that Japan was invited to join the Philippine-Indonesian bid. After the FIBA Board Meeting in May 2017 several media reported that Japan has joined the Philippine-Indonesian bid. Japan's participation in the bid was proposed by FIBA

According to media reports Manila will be host to four Preliminary Round Groups, two Second Round Groups and the Final tournament phase from Quarterfinals onwards. As well Okinawa and Jakarta will each be host to two Preliminary Round Groups and one Second Round Group.

Singapore
There were plans to have Singapore as the fourth co-bidding country in the joint bid. On May 25, 2017 SBP officials had a dialog with their counterparts from the Basketball Association of Singapore (BAS) about joining the bid. If Singapore joined the each venue would have stage two Preliminary Round Groups and one Second Round Group.

Bid rationale and theme
The bid focused on the passion for the game especially by fans from the primary hosting country, the Philippines, and the Consortium appealed to FIBA goal in growing the sport of basketball, with a combined population base of 500 million people. The bid revolved on the mottos "The Power of Three" and "Play Louder than Ever". Future infrastructure plans were also discussed during the bid presentation.

Proposed venues
Six venues from six host cities were proposed for the bid.

Bid evaluation and review

Philippines

From October 21-22, 2017, a three-man evaluation commission consisting of FIBA Central Board Members Hamane Niang of Mali and Ingo Weiss of Germany, and FIBA Senior Consultant Lubomir Kotleba of Slovakia came to the Philippines having already evaluated the Russian and Argentina-Uruguay bids. The Philippine government through Foreign Affairs Secretary Alan Peter Cayetano and President Rodrigo Duterte assured the commission of its support in a 19 October meeting at the Manila Hotel.

A bid presentation was held on October 21 at the Conrad Manila hotel in Pasay, Metro Manila. The bid which has the official slogan of "Play Louder Than Ever", was presented to the visiting FIBA commission.

Among those who spoke during the bid presentation are SBP Chairman emeritus Manny Pangilinan, SBP President Al Panlilio, and Foreign Affairs Secretary Cayetano. Consortium partners were also present during the bid presentation, with Japan Basketball Association Secretary-General Hirota Matsuhiro and Indonesian Basketball Association President Danny Kosasih, coming in with a staff of three.

Japan
When FIBA officials made evaluations in Okinawa, Japan, they were presented blueprints and animated sketches of Okinawa Arena, the proposed Japanese venue for the FIBA Basketball World Cup which was then in the planning stages. It is planned to be ready for the 2020 Summer Olympics.

Bid presentation
The final bid presentation was made in Mies, Switzerland with the host countries of the 2023 FIBA Basketball World Cup announced on the same day. The joint Philippine-Japanese-Indonesian bid was favored by FIBA over Argentina and Uruguay's. However the two South American countries are given the chance to bid for the 2027 FIBA Basketball World Cup unopposed. They are to revise their bid according to FIBA's recommendations and represent their bid in June 2018. However Argentina and Uruguay decided to withdraw the bid for the 2027 edition.

See also
Philippine bid for the 2019 FIBA Basketball World Cup

References

2023 FIBA Basketball World Cup
Basketball in Indonesia
Basketball in Japan
Philippines at the FIBA Basketball World Cup
FIBA Basketball World Cup bids